Rob, Bob, or Robert Dickey may refer to:

 R. A. Dickey (Robert Allen Dickey, born 1974), baseball player
 Robert B. Dickey (1811–1903), Canadian politician
 Robert S. Dickey (1921–1991), American phytopathologist
 Robert J. Dickey (born c. 1957), American business executive
 Robert Dickey (American politician), American politician from Georgia